The 3rd Cavalry Division (3. Kavallerie-Division) was a unit of the Prussian Army, part of German Army in World War I. The division was formed on the mobilization of the German Army in August 1914. The division was disbanded in November 1916.

Combat chronicle 
It was initially assigned to IV Cavalry Corps, which preceded the 4th and 5th Armies on the Western Front. In December 1914, it was involved in occupation duties in Belgium. On 6 April 1915, it was transferred to Russia and dissolved there on 1 September 1916. It was reformed in Hungary on 9 September 1916 and later moved to Transylvania. It was finally dissolved in November 1916.

A more detailed combat chronicle can be found at the German-language version of this article.

Order of Battle on mobilisation 
On formation, in August 1914, the component units of the division were:

16th Cavalry Brigade (from VIII Corps District)
7th Jäger zu Pferde
8th Jäger zu Pferde
22nd Cavalry Brigade (from XI Corps District)
5th (Rhenish) Dragoons "Baron Manteuffel"
14th (2nd Kurhessian) Hussars "Landgrave Frederick II of Hesse-Homburg"
25th Cavalry Brigade (from XVIII Corps District)
23rd Guards Dragoons (1st Grand Ducal Hessian)
24th Life Dragoons (2nd Grand Ducal Hessian)
Horse Artillery Abteilung of the 11th (1st Kurhessian) Field Artillery Regiment
2nd Machine Gun Detachment
Pioneer Detachment
Signals Detachment
Heavy Wireless Station 11
Light Wireless Station 18
Light Wireless Station 19
Cavalry Motorised Vehicle Column 3

See: Table of Organisation and Equipment

Changes in organization 
16th Cavalry Brigade became independent on 1 September 1916
22nd Cavalry Brigade joined 2nd Cavalry Division on 13 August 1916
25th Cavalry Brigade joined 2nd Cavalry Division on 23 September 1916
1st Cavalry Brigade joined on 13 October 1916 from 1st Cavalry Division (renamed Siebenburgishe Cavalry Brigade on 1 June 1917.)

See also 

German Army (German Empire)
German cavalry in World War I
German Army order of battle (1914)

References

Bibliography 
 
 

Cavalry divisions of Germany in World War I
Military units and formations established in 1914
Military units and formations disestablished in 1916